Abraham P. Hankins (1900–1963) was an American modernist painter.

Hankins was born in the Russian Empire and emigrated to the United States in 1914.

He studied at the Academy Julien in Paris and the Philadelphia Academy of Fine Arts.

His work is held by the Barnes Foundation. His works also have been displayed in the Museum of Fine Arts, New York; the Pennsylvania Academy of the Fine Arts; the Philadelphia Museum of Art; and in the Lessing J. Rosenwald collection. His papers are in the Archives of American Art.

Hankins died while on vacation in Miami Beach, Florida.

References

External links
http://www.artnet.com/artists/abraham-p-hankins/past-auction-results
http://www.google.com/search?q=abraham%20p.%20hankins&biw=1366&bih=667&sei=ySfQTryjBsqosQKuzvC8Dg&tbm=isch

20th-century American painters
American male painters
1900 births
1963 deaths
20th-century American male artists
Emigrants from the Russian Empire to the United States